Cary Vaughan is an American English language instructor and journalist best known for her role in the Terry A. Anderson hostage crisis in Lebanon. An instructor at the American University of Beirut and a part-time worker at Associated Press bureau there, Vaughan and her husband Bill Foley, an AP photojournalist, were friends with Anderson prior to his abduction. Following his abduction by Hezbollah militants, Vaughan and Foley worked to secure his release. For their efforts, the pair received one of the first International Press Freedom Awards from the Committee to Protect Journalists in 1991.

References

American women journalists
Living people
Year of birth missing (living people)
21st-century American women